Maximilian Waack (born 12 January 1996) is a German professional footballer who plays as a midfielder for FC Astoria Walldorf.

Career
On 4 August 2019 it was confirmed, that Waack had joined TuS Mechtersheim.

In December 2019, he signed for FC Astoria Walldorf on a one-and-a-half-year contract.

Career statistics

References

1996 births
Living people
Sportspeople from Ludwigshafen
German footballers
Association football midfielders
Regionalliga players
Austrian Football Bundesliga players
FSV Oggersheim players
1. FC Kaiserslautern players
FC Astoria Walldorf players
TSG 1899 Hoffenheim players
TSG 1899 Hoffenheim II players
SC Austria Lustenau players
TuS Mechtersheim players
German expatriate footballers
German expatriate sportspeople in Austria
Expatriate footballers in Austria
Footballers from Rhineland-Palatinate